An-Nasir Muhammad ibn Qaitbay (1482 – 31 October 1498) was the son of Qaitbay, and a Mamluk sultan of Egypt from 7 August 1496 to 31 October 1498. His first wife was Gevhermelik Hatun, daughter of Cem Sultan and granddaughter of Ottoman Sultan Mehmed II the Conqueror.

References

Burji sultans
15th-century Mamluk sultans
1482 births
1498 deaths
Circassian Mamluks